NSE EMERGE is the National Stock Exchange of India's new initiative for small and medium-sized enterprises and startup companies from India. These companies can get listed on NSE without Initial public offering (IPO). This platform helps SMEs and Startups to connect with investors for funding. During August 2019, NSE got the 200th company listed on its SME platform.

Since FY13, 200 companies were listed, raising Rs 3,136 crore collectively on the platform. The First company listed on the SME IPO platform was Thejo Engineering from Chennai and Wonder Fibromats was the 200th firm to be listed on the platform.

SME IPO 
SME IPO is specially designed for SMEs and Startups to raise a capital with minimum compliance and cost compare to regular IPO. In case of NSE EMERGE, companies need to take an approval from board, not SEBI.

Many companies have shifted to main board from SME platform, which shows the success of the SME exchange by NSE.

List of the Companies with SME IPO 
Since FY 2013, Following companies did SME IPO on National Stock Exchange of India's NSE EMERGE.

 A And M Jumbo Bags Limited
 A B Infrabuild Limited
 Aakash Exploration Services Limited
 Aaron Industries Limited
 Aarvi Encon Limited
 Accord Synergy Limited
 Accuracy Shipping Limited
 Ace Integrated Solutions Limited
 Ahimsa Industries Limited
 Ahlada Engineers Limited
 Airo Lam Limited
 Ajooni Biotech Limited
 Akash Infra Projects Limited
 Akg Exim Limited
 Ambani Organics Limited
 Ani Integrated Services Limited
 Art Nirman Limited
 Artedz Fabs Limited
 Arvee Laboratories (India) Limited
 Asl Industries Limited
 Aurangabad Distillery Limited
 Avg Logistics Limited
 Avon Moldplast Limited
 Avsl Industries Limited
 B&b Triplewall Containers Limited
 Baba Agro Food Limited
 Banka Bioloo Limited
 Bansal Multiflex Limited
 Beta Drugs Limited
 Bohra Industries Limited
 Bombay Super Hybrid Seeds Limited
 Brand Concepts Limited
 Bright Solar Limited
 Cadsys (India) Limited
 Ckp Leisure Limited
 Ckp Products Limited
 CMM Infraprojects Limited
 Continental Seeds And Chemicals Limited
 Crown Lifters Limited
 D P Wires Limited
 D. P. Abhushan Limited
 Dangee Dums Limited
 Debock Sales And Marketing Limited
 Dev Information Technology Limited
 Dhanuka Realty Limited
 Drs Dilip Roadlines Limited
 E2e Networks Limited
 Emkay Taps And Cutting Tools Limited
 Euro India Fresh Foods Limited
 Felix Industries Limited
 Five Core Electronics Limited
 Focus Lighting And Fixtures Limited
 Fourth Dimension Solutions Limited
 Ganga Forging Limited
 Geekay Wires Limited
 Giriraj Civil Developers Limited
 Global Education Limited
 Globe International Carriers Limited
 Globe Textiles (India) Limited
 Godha Cabcon & Insulation Limited
 Goldstar Power Limited
 Gretex Industries Limited
 Hec Infra Projects Limited
 Hindcon Chemicals Limited
 Husys Consulting Limited
 Ice Make Refrigeration Limited
 Innovana Thinklabs Limited
 Innovative Tyres And Tubes Limited
 Iris Clothings Limited
 Jakharia Fabric Limited
 Jalan Transolutions (India) Limited
 Jash Engineering Limited
 Jet Freight Logistics Limited
 Jet Knitwears Limited
 Kapston Facilities Management Limited
 Keerti Knowledge And Skills Limited
 Khfm Hospitality And Facility Management Services Limited
 Kkv Agro Powers Limited
 Kritika Wires Limited
 Kshitij Polyline Limited
 Lagnam Spintex Limited
 Latteys Industries Limited
 Laxmi Cotspin Limited
 Lexus Granito (India) Limited
 M K Proteins Limited
 Macpower Cnc Machines Limited
 Madhav Copper Limited
 Madhya Pradesh Today Media Limited
 Mahickra Chemicals Limited
 Manav Infra Projects Limited
 Marine Electricals (India) Limited
 Marshall Machines Limited
 Marvel Decor Limited
 Milton Industries Limited
 Mindpool Technologies Limited
 Mitcon Consultancy & Engineering Services Limited
 Mittal Life Style Limited
 Mmp Industries Limited
 Mohini Health & Hygiene Limited
 Moksh Ornaments Limited
 Nandani Creation Limited
 Narmada Agrobase Limited
 Nitiraj Engineers Limited
 Omfurn India Limited
 Opal Luxury Time Products Limited
 Osia Hyper Retail Limited
 Panache Digilife Limited
 Pansari Developers Limited
 Par Drugs And Chemicals Limited
 Parin Furniture Limited
 Pashupati Cotspin Limited
 Penta Gold Limited
 Perfect Infraengineers Limited
 Power & Instrumentation (Gujarat) Limited
 Powerful Technologies Limited
 Priti International Limited
 Prolife Industries Limited
 Pulz Electronics Limited
 Pushpanjali Realms And Infratech Limited
 R M Drip And Sprinklers Systems Limited
 Rajnandini Metal Limited
 Rajshree Polypack Limited
 Reliable Data Services Limited
 Rkec Projects Limited
 S.s. Infrastructure Development Consultants Limited
 Saketh Exim Limited
 Salasar Exteriors And Contour Limited
 Sarveshwar Foods Limited
 Secur Credentials Limited
 Servotech Power Systems Limited
 Shaival Reality Limited
 Shanti Overseas (India) Limited
 Shradha Infraprojects Limited
 Shree Ram Proteins Limited
 Shree Tirupati Balajee Fibc Limited
 Shree Vasu Logistics Limited
 Shreeoswal Seeds And Chemicals Limited
 Shri Ram Switchgears Limited
 Shubhlaxmi Jewel Art Limited
 Sikko Industries Limited
 Silgo Retail Limited
 Silly Monks Entertainment Limited
 Silver Touch Technologies Limited
 Sintercom India Limited
 Sks Textiles Limited
 Smvd Poly Pack Limited
 Softtech Engineers Limited
 Solex Energy Limited
 Sonam Clock Limited
 Soni Soya Products Limited
 Spectrum Electrical Industries Limited
 Supreme (India) Impex Limited
 Supreme Engineering Limited
 Surani Steel Tubes Limited
 Surevin Bpo Services Limited
 Suumaya Lifestyle Limited
 Tara Chand Logistic Solutions Limited
 Thejo Engineering Limited
 Tirupati Forge Limited
 Total Transport Systems Limited
 Touchwood Entertainment Limited
 Transwind Infrastructures Limited
 Ultra Wiring Connectivity System Limited
 Uniinfo Telecom Services Limited
 United Polyfab Gujarat Limited
 Univastu India Limited
 Uravi T And Wedge Lamps Limited
 Ushanti Colour Chem Limited
 Vadivarhe Speciality Chemicals Limited
 Vaishali Pharma Limited
 Vasa Retail And Overseas Ltd
 Vera Synthetic Limited
 Vertoz Advertising Limited
 Vinny Overseas Limited
 Wealth First Portfolio Managers Limited
 Wonder Fibromats Limited
 Worth Peripherals Limited
 Zodiac Energy Limited

References 

Stock exchanges in India
Financial services companies based in Mumbai
2012 establishments in Maharashtra
Indian companies established in 2012
Financial services companies established in 2012